Shadeland is a town in Union Township, Tippecanoe County, in the U.S. state of Indiana. The population was 1,610 at the 2010 census.

It is part of the Lafayette, Indiana Metropolitan Statistical Area.

History
A post office was established at Shadeland in 1887, and remained in operation until it was discontinued in 1915.

Farmers Institute and Stidham United Methodist Church are listed on the National Register of Historic Places.

Geography
Shadeland is located at  (40.373210, -86.949180) and has an elevation of approximately 620 feet.  Indiana State Road 25 passes east and west through town.

The town is coextensive with Union Township in Tippecanoe County. The township chose to incorporate in order to prevent partial or total annexation by neighboring Lafayette.

Demographics

2010 census
As of the census of 2010, there were 1,610 people, 616 households, and 476 families living in the town. The racial makeup of the town was 96.0% White, 0.4% African American, 0.6% Native American, 0.5% Asian, 0.1% Pacific Islander, 1.4% from other races, and 1.0% from two or more races. Hispanic or Latino of any race were 3.3% of the population.

There were 616 households, of which 30.5% had children under the age of 18 living with them, 62.2% were married couples living together, 10.1% had a female householder with no husband present, 5.0% had a male householder with no wife present, and 22.7% were non-families. 17.4% of all households were made up of individuals, and 6.8% had someone living alone who was 65 years of age or older. The average household size was 2.61 and the average family size was 2.94.

The median age in the town was 43.2 years. 21.8% of residents were under the age of 18; 8.3% were between the ages of 18 and 24; 22.2% were from 25 to 44; 33.9% were from 45 to 64; and 13.8% were 65 years of age or older. The gender makeup of the town was 49.2% male and 50.8% female.

2000 census
As of the census of 2000, there were 1,682 people, 602 households, and 471 families living in the town. There were 676 housing units at an average density of 24.9 per square mile (9.6/km). The racial makeup of the town was 97.44% White, 0.30% African American, 0.18% Native American, 0.77% Asian, 0.71% from other races, and 0.59% from two or more races. Hispanic or Latino of any race were 2.97% of the population.

There were 602 households, out of which 36.9% had children under the age of 18 living with them, 66.4% were married couples living together, 5.3% had a female householder with no husband present, and 21.6% were non-families. 16.9% of all households were made up of individuals, and 6.1% had someone living alone who was 65 years of age or older. The average household size was 2.79 and the average family size was 3.15.

In the town, the population was spread out, with 27.6% under the age of 18, 7.6% from 18 to 24, 27.5% from 25 to 44, 28.7% from 45 to 64, and 8.7% who were 65 years of age or older. The median age was 38 years. For every 100 females, there were 107.9 males. For every 100 females age 18 and over, there were 104.4 males.

The median income for a household in the town was $48,750, and the median income for a family was $56,875. Males had a median income of $36,810 versus $23,897 for females. The per capita income for the town was $20,631. About 1.9% of families and 3.1% of the population were below the poverty line, including 1.1% of those under age 18 and 5.4% of those age 65 or over.

References

External links
 Town of Shadeland, Indiana website

Towns in Tippecanoe County, Indiana
Towns in Indiana
Lafayette metropolitan area, Indiana
Populated places established in 1984